Safe In the Steep Cliffs is the second studio album by Emancipator, released 19 January 2010.



Tracks
The album includes the following tracks.

References 

2010 albums
Emancipator (musician) albums